The Voice Cambodia was a Cambodian reality singing competition. The first season premiered on Hang Meas HDTV on August 3, 2014. One of the important premises of the show is the quality of the singing talent. Four coaches, themselves popular performing artists, train the talents in their group. Talents are selected in blind auditions, where the coaches cannot see, but only hear the auditioner. The winner will receive 100 million Cambodian riel ($25,000), and become a singer for Hang Meas Production. As of January 2023, a third season is set to return.

It is the fifth national franchise in the Southeast Asian region after Vietnam, Thailand, Indonesia, and Philippines.

Format
The series consists of three phases: 
 Blind audition
 Battle round
 Live performance shows

The Blind Auditions
Four judges/coaches, all famous musicians, will choose teams of contestants through a blind audition process. Each judge has the length of the auditionee's performance to decide if he or she wants that singer on his or her team; if two or more judges want the same singer then the singer gets to choose which coach they want to work with.

Battle round
Each team of singers will be mentored and developed by their coach. In the second stage, coaches will have two of their team members battle against each other by singing the same song, with the coach choosing which team member will advance to the next stage, but the one who is not chosen by the coach still has another chance from another coaches' steal to advance them to the next stage too.

Live performance shows
In the final phase, the remaining contestants will compete against each other in live broadcasts. The television audience will help to decide who moves on. When one team member remains for each coach, the contestants will compete against each other in the finale.

Hosts and coaches

Hosts
The hosts are Chea Vibol and Chan Keonimol.

Coaches
The four judges are Aok Sokunkanha, Chhorn Sovannareach, Pich Sophea and Nop Bayyareth. Chhorn Sovannareach  has become a super star since when he stepped into Reaksmey Hang Meas Production because of his sweet and smoothing voice. Pich Sophea rose to fame with her hit single "Better Day" and has been a popular solo artist since. In addition, she is good at dancing as well. Aok Sokunkanha is good at singing classical, rock and fast songs. She is the top female artist in Cambodia. She's one of the most well known artists in modern music. Nop Bayyareth is another well known singer who has many hit songs. He is known for his distinctive voice and style.

Season summary
Colour key

 Team Chhorn
 Team Pich

 Team Aok
 Team Nop

Coaches' teams 
Color key

Season

Season 1

Season 2

References

External links 
 
 

Cambodian television series
Cambodia
2014 Cambodian television series debuts
2014 Cambodian television series endings
2010s Cambodian television series
Hang Meas HDTV original programming